Macroglossum godeffroyi is a moth of the  family Sphingidae. It is known from Fiji.

This species is distinguished from all other Sphingidae by the presence of tufts of long hairs on the mid- and hind-tibia, similar to those of the abdominal scent organ. The abdomen has very prominent dorso-lateral black spots. The forewing upperside antemedian band is very broad, touching a large disco-marginal area of the same colour, the discocellular veins within the band thus separating the grey median area into a costal and posterior patch.

References

Macroglossum
Moths described in 1885